Daniel A. Haber is the director of the Massachusetts General Hospital Cancer Center, a professor of oncology at Harvard Medical School, and an investigator of the Howard Hughes Medical Institute (HHMI).

Career 
Haber earned his B.S. in life sciences and M.S. in toxicology from Massachusetts Institute of Technology, and his M.D. and Ph.D. in biophysics from Stanford University School of Medicine under the mentorship of Robert T. Schimke.  He did his postdoctoral training at Massachusetts Institute of Technology with David E. Housman.

As a postdoc, he started to study Wilms' tumor and characterized the tumor suppressor gene WT1 and WTX.  In 2003, he recognized that certain patients with lung cancer responded well to the drug Iressa where few other patients showed effect. Sequencing the patient's cancers, they identified specific mutation in epidermal growth factor receptor (EGFR) that resulted in sensitivity to certain drugs.  By linking mutations to drug sensitivity, they were able to propose new mechanisms for targeted therapies by examining the accumulation of certain mutations in cancer cells. His lab is now focused on studying the genetics of cancer particularly in circulating tumor cells with Mehmet Toner.

He is a fellow of the American Academy of Arts and Sciences and a member of the National Academy of Medicine, the National Academy of Sciences, the Association of American Physicians, and the American Society for Clinical Investigation. He is an editor of Cell and Cancer Cell.

External links 
His Howard Hughes Medical Institute bio
Haber Lab website

References

Living people
American biochemists
Howard Hughes Medical Investigators
Harvard Medical School faculty
Massachusetts Institute of Technology School of Science alumni
Stanford University School of Medicine alumni
Fellows of the American Academy of Arts and Sciences
Members of the National Academy of Medicine
Year of birth missing (living people)